Vilarmaior is a municipality in  the province of A Coruña in the autonomous community of Galicia in northwestern Spain. It belongs to the comarca of Betanzos.

References

Municipalities in the Province of A Coruña